K.C. Singh is an Indian Civil servant and was the Indian ambassador to Iran and UAE.

Career
He is a 1974 batch officer of the Indian Foreign Service.

External links
Ambassadors of India to UAE

References

Ambassadors of India to Iran
Indian Foreign Service officers